BidPay was an online auction payment service website, established in 1999 by Steve Chin and Marek Bradbury that allowed auction buyers to purchase money orders online using their credit card. BidPay was purchased by First Data Corporation/Western Union in 2001 for an undisclosed sum. BidPay was rebranded as "Western Union Auction Payments" in 2003 which led to confusion with Western Union's wire transfer services; the online auction payment service reverted to the BidPay name in 2004. BidPay ceased operations on 31 December 2005 and was purchased for US$1.8 million in March 2006 by CyberSource Corporation, which announced its intention to relaunch BidPay.  BidPay had over 4 million registered users worldwide at that time.

BidPay was a popular payment method for auction sellers based in North America because there was no chargeback or reversal risk, as there was with competing services such as PayPal. The buyer of an item or service was responsible for all fees, and US sellers had the option of receiving an ACH payment direct into their bank account. However, when a buyer successfully made a chargeback in a disputed transaction, BidPay ended up taking the loss rather than the seller.

BidPay was relaunched in June 2006 based on an operating model similar to that of a merchant account for auction sales. Sellers were now responsible for all fees and had to have a US-based bank account that accepted ACH payments since money orders were no longer issued. Before approving payment, Bidpay reviewed payments via automated fraud checks.  Also, sellers had to ship by a track and trace shipper. Bidpay would assume the risk of chargebacks if the seller followed all the requirements under the user agreement.

BidPay.com, Inc. finally discontinued operations on December 31, 2007.

See also 
 CyberSource
 BitPay

References

External links
CyberSource Corp.

Digital currencies
Financial services companies established in 1999
Western Union